Kashibai Bajirao Ballal is an Indian historical drama based on Kashibai. It premiered on 15 November 2021 on Zee TV with Aarohi Patel as Young Kashi Bai and Venkatesh Pandey as Young Bajirao. On 21 March 2022, the story moved on several years and Riya Sharma portrays the lead role of  Kashibai opposite Rohit Chandel who essays the role of Bajirao. It went off air on 19 August 2022, after completing 201 episodes.

Cast

Main 
 Riya Sharma as Kashibai Bajirao Bhatt – Mahadji Krishna Joshi and Shiubai's daughter, Peshwinbai, Bajirao's first wife (2022) 
 Aarohi Patel as Child Kashi Joshi / Child Kashi Bajirao Bhatt  (2021–2022)
 Rohit Chandel as Baji Rao I Bhatt – Peshwa of Maratha Empire, Balaji Vishwanath and Radhabai Barve's son, Chimaji Appa, Anubai and Bhiubai's brother, Kashibai and Mastani's husband (2022)
Venkatesh Pandey as Young Bajirao Bhatt (2021–2022)

Recurring 
 Farnaz Shetty as Mastani – Maharaj Chhatrasal and Ruhani Begum's daughter, Bajirao's second wife (2022)
 Vidisha Srivastav as Shiu Krishna Joshi 
 Tarun Khanna as Balaji Vishwanath Bhatt (2021-2022)
 Aishwarya Narkar as Radha Balaji Bhatt
 Khalid Siddiqui as Chhatrapati Shahu I Bhonsle
 Nabeel Mirajkar as Chimaji Appa Bhatt
 Smita Jaykar as Maharani Tarabai Rajaram Bhonsle
 Prashant Singh Rajput as Krishnarao Joshi
 Amit Pandey as Dacoit Mangal Singh
 Hetal Yadav as Bhavani Krishna Joshi
 Amol Bawdekar as Mahadji Krishna Joshi
 Vishal Chaudhary as Balarao Joshi (2021-2022)
Palak Rana as Ganga 
Urmi as Annubai 
 Twinkle Saini as Bhiu Joshi
Tejaswi Parab as Kaveri
Chhaya Katare as Jaishree
Ankur Chaturvedi as Koshadaksh 
Chitra Sharma as Mandhara 
Jyoti Katariya as Mala
 Suneel Pushkarna as Maharaj Chhatrasal Bundela
 Rudrakshi Gupta as Ruhani Begum
 Naveen Sharma as Surya
 Ishaan Raj as Matang, Mastani's best friend

References

Zee TV original programming
Indian television soap operas
2021 Indian television series debuts
2022 Indian television series endings
Indian period television series
Television shows based on Indian novels
Indian historical television series